Dihydroxyacetone (DHA), also known as glycerone, is a simple saccharide (a triose) with formula .

DHA is primarily used as an ingredient in sunless tanning products. It is often derived from plant sources such as sugar beets and sugar cane, and by the fermentation of glycerin.

Chemistry
DHA is a hygroscopic white crystalline powder. It has a sweet cooling taste and a characteristic odor. It is the simplest of all ketoses and has no chiral center or optical activity. The normal form is a dimer (2,5-bis(hydroxymethyl)-1,4-dioxane-2,5-diol) which is slowly soluble in one part water and 15 parts ethanol. When freshly prepared, it reverts rapidly to the monomer in solution.

The monomer is very soluble in water, ethanol, diethyl ether, acetone and toluene.

DHA may be prepared, along with glyceraldehyde, by the mild oxidation of glycerol, for example with hydrogen peroxide and a ferrous salt as catalyst. It can also be prepared in high yield and selectivity at room temperature from glycerol using cationic palladium-based catalysts with oxygen, air or benzoquinone acting as co-oxidants. Glyceraldehyde is a structural isomer of dihydroxyacetone.

Biology
Its phosphorylated form, dihydroxyacetone phosphate (DHAP), takes part in glycolysis, and it is an intermediate product of fructose metabolism.

Uses
DHA was first recognized as a skin coloring agent by German scientists in the 1920s. Through its use in the X-ray process, it was noted as causing the skin surface to turn brown when spilled.

In the 1950s, Eva Wittgenstein at the University of Cincinnati did further research with dihydroxyacetone. Her studies involved using DHA as an oral drug for assisting children with glycogen storage disease. The children received large doses of DHA by mouth, and sometimes spat or spilled the substance onto their skin. Healthcare workers noticed that the skin turned brown after a few hours of DHA exposure.

Eva Wittgenstein continued to experiment with DHA, painting liquid solutions of it onto her own skin. She was able to consistently reproduce the pigmentation effect, and noted that DHA did not appear to penetrate beyond the stratum corneum, or dead skin surface layer (the FDA eventually concluded this is not entirely true). Research then continued on DHA's skin coloring effect in relation to treatment for patients with vitiligo.

This skin browning effect is non-toxic, and is a result of a Maillard reaction. DHA reacts chemically with the amino acids in the protein keratin, the major component of the skin surface. Different amino acids react to DHA in different ways, producing different tones of coloration from yellow to brown. The resulting pigments are called melanoidins. These are similar in coloration to melanin, the natural substance in the deeper skin layers which brown or "tan", from exposure to UV rays.

Winemaking
Both acetic acid bacteria Acetobacter aceti and Gluconobacter oxydans use glycerol as a carbon source to form dihydroxyacetone. DHA is formed by ketogenesis of glycerol. It can affect the sensory quality of the wine with sweet/etherish properties. DHA can also react with proline to produce a "crust-like" aroma. Dihydroxyacetone can affect the anti-microbial activity in wine, as it has the ability to bind SO2.

Sunless tanning
Coppertone introduced the first consumer sunless tanning lotion into the marketplace in the 1960s. This product was called "Quick Tan" or "QT". It was sold as an overnight tanning agent, and other companies followed suit with similar products. Consumers soon tired of this product due to unattractive results such as orange palms, streaking and poor coloration. Because of the QT experience, many people still associate sunless tanning with fake-looking orange tans.

In the 1970s the United States Food and Drug Administration (FDA) added DHA permanently to their list of approved cosmetic ingredients.

By the 1980s, new sunless tanning formulations appeared on the market and refinements in the DHA manufacturing process created products that produced a more natural looking color and better fading. Consumer concerns surrounding damage associated with UV tanning options spurred further popularity of sunless tanning products as an alternative to UV tanning. Dozens of brands appeared on drugstore shelves, in numerous formulations.

Today, DHA is the main active ingredient in many sunless tanning skincare preparations. Lotion manufacturers also produce a wide variety of sunless tanning preparations that replace DHA with natural bronzing agents such as black walnut shell. DHA may be used alone or combined with other tanning components such as erythrulose. DHA is considered the most effective sun-free tanning additive.

Sunless tanning products contain DHA in concentrations ranging from 1% to 20%. Most drugstore products range from 3% to 5%, with professional products ranging from 5% to 20%. The percentages correspond with the product coloration levels from light to dark. Lighter products are more beginner-friendly, but may require multiple coats to produce the desired color depth. Darker products produce a dark tan in one coat, but are also more prone to streaking, unevenness, or off-color tones. The artificial tan takes 2 to 4 hours to begin appearing on the skin surface, and will continue to darken for 24 to 72 hours, depending on formulation type.

Once the darkening effect has occurred, the tan will not sweat off or wash away with soap or water. It will fade gradually over 3 to 10 days. Exfoliation, prolonged water submersion, or heavy sweating can lighten the tan, as these all contribute to rapid dead skin cell exfoliation (the dead skin cells are the tinted portion of the sunless tan).

Current sunless tanners are formulated into sprays, lotions, gels, mousses, and cosmetic wipes. Professional applied products include spray tanning booths, airbrush tan applications, and hand applied lotions, gels, mousses and wipes.

DHA safety considerations
For the 24 hours after self-tanner (containing high DHA levels, ~5%) is applied, the skin is especially susceptible to free-radical damage from sunlight, according to a 2007 study led by Katinka Jung of the Gematria Test Lab in Berlin. Forty minutes after the researchers treated skin samples with high levels of DHA they found that more than 180 percent additional free radicals formed during sun exposure compared with untreated skin. Another self-tanner ingredient, erythrulose, produced a similar response at high levels. For a day after self-tanner application, excessive sun exposure should be avoided and sunscreen should be worn outdoors, they say; an antioxidant cream could also minimize free radical production. Although some self-tanners contain sunscreen, its effect will not last long after application, and a fake tan itself will not protect the skin from UV exposure.

The study by Jung et al. further confirms earlier results demonstrating that dihydroxyacetone in combination with dimethylisosorbide enhances the process of (sun-based) tanning. This earlier study also found that dihydroxyacetone also has an effect on the amino acids and nucleic acids which is bad for the skin.

The free radicals are in part due to the action of UV light on AGE (advanced glycation end products) such as Amadori products (a type of AGE) as a result of the reaction of DHA with the skin. AGEs are behind the damage to the skin that occurs with high blood sugar in diabetes where similar glycation occurs. Some of the damage from AGE is independent of UV light. A study showed glycation of a protein increases its free-radical production rate nearly fifty-fold.

Although some self-tanners contain sunscreen, its effect will not last as long as the tan. The skin browning of a sunless tan may provide some UV protection (up to SPF 3), but this low-level protection should be supplemented with additional protection. The stated SPF for the product is only applicable for a few hours after application of the self-tanner. Despite darkening of the skin, an individual is just as susceptible to harmful UV rays, therefore an overall sun protection is still very necessary. There may also be some inhibition of vitamin D production in DHA-treated skin.

Contact dermatitis is occasionally reported, and a recent study showed that DHA causes severe contact dermatitis in Mexican hairless dogs.

DHA-based sunless tanning has been recommended by the Skin Cancer Foundation, American Academy of Dermatology Association, Canadian Dermatology Association and the American Medical Association as a safer alternative to sun-bathing.

The use of DHA in 'tanning' booths as an all-over spray has not been approved by the FDA, since safety data to support this use has not been submitted to the agency for review and evaluation. A June 2012 FDA report claims the main chemical found inside that spray - DHA - is potentially hazardous when inhaled. Some of the DHA if inhaled can cause damage to cells and possibly lead to cancer according to physicians.

An opinion issued by the European Commission's Scientific Committee on Consumer Safety, concluding spray tanning with DHA did not pose risk, has been heavily criticized by specialists. This is because the cosmetics industry in Europe chose the evidence to review, according to the commission itself. Thus, nearly every report the commission's eventual opinion referenced came from studies that were never published or peer-reviewed and, in the majority of cases, were performed by companies or industry groups linked to the manufacturing of DHA. The industry left out nearly all of the peer-reviewed studies published in publicly available scientific journals that identified DHA as a potential mutagen. A study by scientists from the Department of Dermatology, Bispebjerg Hospital, published in Mutation Research has concluded DHA 'induces DNA damage, cell-cycle block and apoptosis' in cultured cells. More recent research has shown that DHA induces stress response gene expression and signaling in reconstructed human epidermis and cultured keratinocytes, as obvious from rapid activation of phospho-protein signal transduction [p-p38, p-Hsp27(S15/S78), p-eIF2α] and gene expression changes (HSPA6, HMOX1, CRYAB, CCL3).

In the report released to ABC News, FDA scientists concluded that DHA does not stop at the outer dead layers of skin. They wrote: "The fate of DHA remaining in skin is an important issue, since high DHA skin levels were found." They added that tests they performed revealed that much of the DHA applied to skin actually ended up in the living layers of skin. They concluded: "This leaves about 11 percent of the applied DHA dose absorbed remaining in the [living] epidermis and dermis." A toxicologist and lung specialist at the University of Pennsylvania's Perelman School of Medicine (Dr. Rey Panettieri) has commented, "The reason I'm concerned is the deposition of the tanning agents into the lungs could really facilitate or aid systemic absorption -- that is, getting into the bloodstream. These compounds in some cells could actually promote the development of cancers or malignancies, and if that's the case then we need to be wary of them."

References

External links
 How Stuff Works
 US FDA/CFSAN - Tanning Pills
 American Academy of Dermatology on Self Tanners
 DHA and Vitiligo

 New Zealand Dermatological Society recommends sunless tanners

Cosmetics chemicals
Diols
Alpha-hydroxy ketones
Trioses